Breland is a village in Lindesnes municipality in Agder county, Norway. The village is located just over the border from the neighboring Kristiansand municipality. There are about 70 people living in the rural village and surrounding area. The village is served by Breland Station on the Sørlandet Line. The lake Brelandsvann is located on the east side of the village.

References

Villages in Agder
Lindesnes